The Roman Catholic Diocese of Dedza is a diocese in the city of Dedza, in the Ecclesiastical province of Lilongwe in Malawi.

History
1956-04-29: Established as Apostolic Vicariate of Dedza from the Apostolic Vicariate of Likuni and Apostolic Vicariate of Zomba
1959-04-25: Promoted as Diocese of Dedza

Bishops
Vicar Apostolic of Dedza (Roman rite) 
Bishop Cornelius Chitsulo (1956-11-09 – 1959-04-25 see below)
Bishops of Dedza (Roman rite)
Bishop Cornelius Chitsulo (see above 1959-04-25 – 1984-02-28)
Bishop Gervazio Moses Chisendera (1984-06-25 – 2000-09-07)
Bishop Rémi Joseph Gustave Sainte-Marie, M. Afr. (2000-09-07 – 2006-02-18), appointed Coadjutor Bishop of Lilongwe
Bishop Emmanuele Kanyama (2007-07-04 – 2018-02-17)
Bishop Peter Adrian Chifukwa (2021.05.08 – ...)

Auxiliary Bishops
Rémi Joseph Gustave Sainte-Marie, M. Afr. (1998-2000), appointed Bishop here
Tarcisius Gervazio Ziyaye (1991-1993), appointed Coadjutor Bishop of Lilongwe

Other priest of this diocese who became bishop
Stanislaus Tobias Magombo, appointed auxiliary bishop of Lilongwe in 2009

See also
Roman Catholicism in Malawi

External links
GCatholic.org
Catholic Hierarchy

Dedza
Christian organizations established in 1956
Roman Catholic dioceses and prelatures established in the 20th century
Roman Catholic Ecclesiastical Province of Lilongwe